USCGC Argo (WPC-100) was a  belonging to the United States Coast Guard launched on 12 November 1932 and commissioned on 6 January 1933.

Coast Guard career 
Argo was built by John H. Mathis Company in Camden, New Jersey in 1932 and entered service on 6 January 1933.  Her initial homeport was Stapleton, New York until 13 March 1934 when she was transferred to Newport, Rhode Island.  She remained in Newport until early 1942. During this time she served on United States Coast Guard Academy cadet training cruises in the Atlantic.

Early in 1942 Argo was attached to the Atlantic Fleet as a convoy escort. While on escort duty on 22 June 1942, Argo made a depth charge attack in which the charges failed to explode. On the 27th of the same month, she made another contact at 10:45 but ended the search fifteen minutes later. Investigating the location where the charges were released, her crew observed a large area of bubbles and an oil slick leading to the horizon, presumably in the vicinity but beyond where the attack was made. At 02:10 she released a pattern of three charges and oil was still coming to the surface. Presuming the submarine was destroyed, she changed course to rejoin the convoy.

While Argo was in convoy on 6 January 1944, the merchant tanker Camas Meadows and the Navy gunboat  collided.  St. Augustine sank quickly and Argo rescued 23 survivors and picked up six bodies.  Crewmembers from Argo and her sister ship Thetis were recognized for their actions following the collision.

Sometime after 24 March 1944 Argo was placed in reduced commission at the Chelsea Navy Base near Boston, Massachusetts.

The cutter took aboard a number of prisoners and escorted the German submarines to Portsmouth Navy Yard in Portsmouth, New Hampshire without incident.

Post war service

Later in 1945, Argo was assigned to the First Coast Guard District and was assigned to rescue duty.   Her new homeport was Rockland, Maine.  In 1947 the commander of First Coast Guard District requested to place Argo in "out of commission, in reserve" status due to manpower shortages.  The request was not initially approved.  The establishment of the Weather Patrol Program strained Coast Guard manpower and the Argo was placed in reserve status. The buoy tender  towed the vessel to Cape May, New Jersey where she was laid up.

Later career
Argo was decommissioned on October 30, 1948 and sold on 2 November 1955 to A.T. Davies, Birchfield Boiler, Inc. of Tacoma, Washington for $15,564.  She was eventually acquired by Circle Line Sightseeing Cruises of New York City and greatly modified for passenger service.  She was re-engined with eight General Motors 6-71 Quad diesel engines (four per shaft) and Falk reverse/reduction gears with individual hydraulically operated clutches for each engine.   As of early 2017, she was serving in New York Harbor as Sightseer XII.

Awards
 American Defense Service Medal
 American Campaign Medal
 European-African-Middle Eastern Campaign Medal
 World War II Victory Medal

See also
 List of United States Coast Guard cutters

References

Thetis-class patrol boats
Ships of the United States Coast Guard
World War II patrol vessels of the United States
Ships built by John H. Mathis & Company
1932 ships